Alajos Dornbach (21 January 1936 – 3 June 2021) was a Hungarian lawyer and politician, member of the National Assembly (MP) from 1990 to 2002. As a politician of the Alliance of Free Democrats (SZDSZ), Dornbach served as one of the deputy speakers of the National Assembly between 1990 and 1994.

He graduated from the Faculty of Law of the Eötvös Loránd University.

Dornbach died on 3 June 2021, at the age of 85.

References

1936 births
2021 deaths
20th-century Hungarian lawyers
Eötvös Loránd University alumni
Alliance of Free Democrats politicians
Members of the National Assembly of Hungary (1990–1994)
Members of the National Assembly of Hungary (1994–1998)
Members of the National Assembly of Hungary (1998–2002)
People from Ózd